R. City (short for Rock City; and formerly Planet VI) is a Virgin Islands musical duo formed in 2003, from Saint Thomas, U.S. Virgin Islands. The duo is composed of brothers Theron "Uptown AP" Thomas and Timothy "A.I." Thomas. Primarily known as a songwriting and record production team, the duo has also released various bodies of work as recording artists, including their debut album, What Dreams Are Made Of, released in November 2015. They are best known for the single "Locked Away" featuring American singer Adam Levine.

In 2007, the duo signed with American singer Akon's KonLive Distribution, under the aegis of Geffen Records. During their time there, they released a series of mixtapes with the primary title, PTFAO (Put the F*ckin' Album Out), a reference to the fact that their then-debut album Wake the Neighbors had not been given a release date. In 2011, the duo were released from their contract with KonLive and subsequently founded their own label imprint, Rebelution Records. In 2014, they signed a record deal with American music producer Dr. Luke's Kemosabe Records, under the aegis of RCA Records.

The Thomas brothers have written and produced for several prominent artists in the music industry, including Sean Kingston ("Take You There"), Miley Cyrus ("We Can't Stop"), Nicki Minaj ("Only") and Rihanna ("Pour It Up"). The duo has also contributed to numerous Grammy-nominated albums, including Rihanna's Unapologetic (which won Best Urban Contemporary Album), Jennifer Hudson's self-titled album (which won Best R&B Album), and Ariana Grande's My Everything (which was nominated for Best Pop Vocal Album).

History

Early life and education
Theron and Timothy Thomas are natives of Saint Thomas in the United States Virgin Islands. They grew up in the Oswald Harris Court Projects and graduated from Charlotte Amalie High School. As children, the brothers were backup dancers for a local all-girl rap group. They frequently practiced various genres of music and received support from their parents. In 2000, the two left the Virgin Islands to pursue their music career in Miami. They initially performed under the name 2Ekwip. They had limited success on the Miami nightlife scene. During this time, Theron worked for Kroger and Timothy for Party City. They moved back to St. Thomas in 2005.

Career beginnings and record deal (2006–09)
In 2006, the duo sold their first song, "The Rain," which appeared on American singer-songwriter Akon's triple platinum-selling album Konvicted. By October 2007, Rock City had written songs for performers including Usher, Sean Kingston, Ashlee Simpson, Nicole Scherzinger, and Mary J. Blige. Early songs that saw chart success included "Take You There" by Sean Kingston (number 7 on the Billboard Hot 100), "When I Grow Up" by The Pussycat Dolls (number 9 on the Billboard Hot 100), and "Replay" by Iyaz (number 2 on the Billboard Hot 100). Rock City signed a recording contract with Geffen Records and Akon's KonLive Distribution, in 2007. During this time, Theron was known by the stage name "Da Spokesman" and Timothy was known as "Don't Talk Much." They were set to release their debut album, Wake the Neighbors, some time in 2008,

Label issues, Wake the Neighbors and Planet VI era (2008–13)
Rock City created 15 self-released mixtapes between 2008 and 2012, many of which contained the acronym "PTFAO" (or Put the F*ckin' Album Out) in reference to the fact that the label had not given them a release date for their album. In 2011, the duo parted ways with KonLive and founded their own label imprint called Rebelution Records. They intended to release their debut album, Free At Last, on their own label, but the release date was later pushed back to 2009. Despite the tumult with their record labels, Rock City continued writing songs for other artists during this period. They penned Rihanna's "Man Down" and Justin Bieber's "Run Away Love." In 2013, the duo wrote numerous Billboard Hot 100 songs, including Miley Cyrus' "We Can't Stop", Rihanna's "Pour It Up", and Ciara's "I'm Out." "Pour It Up" appeared on Rihanna's album Unapologetic, which won Best Urban Contemporary Album at the 2014 Grammy Awards.
 The following year, Rock City contributed to three separate albums that received Grammy nominations — Miley Cyrus' Bangerz, Ariana Grande's My Everything (both were nominated in the Best Pop Vocal Album category) and Iggy Azalea's The New Classic (nominated for Best Rap Album).

What Dreams Are Made Of (2014–present)
In 2014, the duo signed with RCA Records and Dr. Luke's Kemosabe Records. Their debut studio album, What Dreams Are Made Of, contains themes of struggle relating to the brothers' often difficult upbringing in Saint Thomas. In 2015, they released singles titled "I'm That..." featuring 2 Chainz and "Locked Away" featuring Adam Levine.

Discography

The discography of Rock City contains numerous singles, mixtapes, and one album. The group has released one album in Japan (Songs That We Wrote) and has also released numerous mixtapes and singles.

References

External links
 
 

United States Virgin Islands culture
American contemporary R&B musical groups
Sibling musical duos
Family musical groups
American musical duos
Alternative hip hop groups
American hip hop groups
Record production duos
American songwriting teams
Hip hop duos
American pop music groups
American hip hop singers
Reggae fusion groups
21st-century American musicians
People from Saint Thomas, U.S. Virgin Islands
United States Virgin Islands musicians
Musical groups established in 2003
2003 establishments in the United States Virgin Islands